The 2015–16 I-League U18 is the eighth season of the Indian I-League U18 competition. The U-18 I-League is the premier age-group football tournament of the country which has been re-structured keeping AFC U-19 Championship in mind. The season began on 8 October 2015. and on 10 February 2016, AIFF Elite Academy won the title by defeating Tata Football Academy 2–0 in the final. AIFF Elite Academy also remained unbeaten in the tournament.

Format
The teams were divided in five groups based on their geographical location and they played on home-and-away basis against each other within the groups. Two teams from each zone advanced to the next round-robin stage where the ten teams were divided into two groups of five teams each. Final round was played at Howrah Municipal Corporation Stadium and East Bengal Ground, and top two teams from each group would book their berths in the semi-finals, which was followed by the third position decider and the final.

Teams
The participants for the 2015-16 season in the I-League U18 are:

Group A - Maharashtra Zone
All times are Indian Standard Time (IST) – UTC+05:30.

Fixtures and results

Group B - Kolkata - Jamshedpur
All times are Indian Standard Time (IST) – UTC+05:30.

Fixtures and results

Group C - Shillong - Guwahati
All times are Indian Standard Time (IST) – UTC+05:30.

Fixtures and results

Group D - Goa Zone
All times are Indian Standard Time (IST) – UTC+05:30.

Fixtures and results

Group E - Rest of India Zone
All times are Indian Standard Time (IST) – UTC+05:30.

Group 1

Fixtures and results

Group 2

Fixtures and results

Final round

Two teams each from Maharashtra, Kolkata–Jamshedpur, Shillong–Guwahati, Goa zone progressed to the final round, while one team each from two Rest of India zones advanced to the final round.

Group A

*All Group A matches were played in Howrah Municipal Corporation Stadium, Kolkata between 27 January to 4 February 2016.

Group B

*All Group B matches were played in East Bengal Ground, Kolkata between 27 January to 4 February 2016.

Bracket
All times are Indian Standard Time (IST) – UTC+05:30.

Semi-finals

Third Place

Final

Statistics

Top scorers

Source: I-League

Most Assists

See also
2015–16 I-League
2015 ISL Season
2015–16 I-League 2nd Division

References

External links
 

I-League U18 seasons
2015–16 in Indian football